The albums discography of American country artist Tanya Tucker consists of 25 studio albums, three live albums, 30 compilation albums, nine video albums and one box set. At age 13, Tucker released her debut album via Columbia Records entitled Delta Dawn (1972). It peaked at number 32 on the Billboard Top Country Albums chart. The following year she released What's Your Mama's Name, followed by Would You Lay with Me (In a Field of Stone). Both studio albums certified gold by the RIAA. Tucker switched to MCA Records in 1975 and released a self-titled album the same year. It peaked at number 8 on the Top Country Albums chart and number 113 on the Billboard 200 records chart. Between 1976 and 1977 she issued four studio albums before the release of her 1978's TNT, which was marketed towards a rock audience. It also certified gold from the RIAA.

After releasing three commercially unsuccessful albums, Tucker made a successful comeback on Capitol Records with Girls Like Me (1986). The album peaked at number 20 on the Top Country Albums chart and produced four top 10 hits on the Billboard Hot Country Songs chart. Tucker released three more successful albums in the 1980s: Love Me Like You Used To (1987), Strong Enough to Bend (1988), and the compilation Greatest Hits (1989). Tucker's 1991 studio release What Do I Do with Me became her first album to certify platinum by the RIAA. The album also certified gold in Canada. In 1992, Can't Run from Yourself  reached number 12 on the Top Country Albums chart and number 51 on the Billboard 200. It would also certify platinum in the United States. After releasing three more studio albums in the 1990s, Tucker issued 2002's Tanya, which was in conjunction with her own Tuckertime record label. In 2009 Tucker released her twenty fourth studio album, My Turn, which featured covers of classic country hits. After a 10 year hiatus, Tucker returned in 2019 with the studio album While I'm Livin'. It was produced by Brandi Carlile and Shooter Jennings.

Studio albums

1970s

1980s

1990s

2000s–2010s

Compilation albums

1970s

1980s

1990s

2000s–2010s

Live albums

Box sets

Video albums

Other album appearances

Notes

References 

Discographies of American artists
Country music discographies